Ontong is a surname. Notable people with the surname include:

Justin Ontong (born 1980), South African cricketer
Rodney Ontong (born 1955), former English first-class cricketer
Shaun Ontong (born 1987), Australian football player

See also
Ontong Java Atoll or Luangiua, one of the largest atolls on earth
Ontong Java flying fox (Pteropus howensis), a species of bat in the family Pteropodidae
Ontong Java Plateau, a huge underwater oceanic plateau located in the Pacific Ocean, lying north of the Solomon Islands